Kel Ajjer (also Kel Azjar, Kel Azjer) is a Tuareg confederation inhabiting western Libya and eastern Algeria. Their main stronghold was Ghat, followed by Ubari. The Kel Ajjer speak Tamahaq, or Northern Tuareg.

See also
Azjar
Kel Adagh
Kel Ahaggar
Kel Ayr
Kel Gres
Aulliminden: Kel Ataram (west) and Kel Dinnik (east)

References 

Maghreb
Sahara
Society of Algeria
Society of Libya
Tuareg confederations